The 1976–77 New Orleans Jazz season was the team's third in the NBA. They began the season hoping to improve upon their 38–44 output from the previous season. They came up three wins shy of tying it, finishing 35–47, and failed to qualify for the playoffs for the third straight season.

Draft picks

Roster

Regular season

Season standings

z – clinched division title
y – clinched division title
x – clinched playoff spot

Record vs. opponents

Awards and records
 Pete Maravich, All-NBA First Team
 E. C. Coleman, NBA All-Defensive First Team

References

Utah Jazz seasons
New Orleans
New Orl
New Orl